Swayang Professor Shonku (None other than Professor Shonku) is a Professor Shonku series book written by Satyajit Ray and published by Ananda Publishers in 1980. Ray wrote the stories about Professor Shanku in Bengali magazines Sandesh and Anandamela. This book is a collection of three Shonku stories.

Stories
 Monro Dweeper Rahasya (Anandamela, Autumn 1977),
 Compu (Anandamela, Autumn 1978),
 Ek Shringa Abhijan, (Sandesh, December 1973 April 1974)

See also
Mahasankatey Shonku
Punashcha Professor Shonku

References

Professor Shonku
1980 short story collections